José Orlandis Rovira (29 April 191824 December 2010) was a Spanish Roman Catholic priest and historian who wrote more than 200 works, including 20 books.

Orlandis became a university professor of law in 1942, and was ordained a priest of Opus Dei in 1946. Much of his work centered on Visigothic Spain and Western Medieval Church.

Works

Estudios visigóticos (1956)
El poder real y la sucesión al trono en la monarquía visigoda (1962)
Tres estudios históricos sobre la colegialidad episcopal (1965)
La crisís de la universidad en España (1967)
Estudios sobre instituciones monásticas medievales (1971)
La Iglesia antigua y medieval (1974)
Historia social y económica de la España visigoda (1975)
La Iglesia en la España visigótica y medieval (1976)
Historia de España: la España visigótica (1977)
Die Synoden auf der Iberischen Halbinsel bis zum Einbruch des Islam (711) (Konziliengeschichte) (1981)
8 bienaventuranzas (NT Religión) (1982)
Hispania y Zaragoza en la Antigüedad tardía: estudios varios (1984)
Época visigoda (409-711) (1987)
Historia del reino visigodo español (1988)
La vida en España en tiempo de los godos (1991)
Semblanzas visigodas (1992)
 
Años de juventud en el Opus Dei (1993)
El Pontificado romano en la historia (1996)
Estudios de historia eclesiástica visigoda (Colección Historia de la Iglesia) (1998)
Historia de la Iglesia: Iniciación Teológica (2001)
Historia del reino visigodo español: los acontecimientos, las instituciones, la sociedad, los protagonistas (2003)

References

External links
Club del Lector
Short History of the Catholic Church (2nd) by Jose Orlandis and Michael Adams - online copy

1918 births
2010 deaths
20th-century Spanish Roman Catholic priests
20th-century Spanish writers
20th-century Spanish male writers
Opus Dei members
People from Palma de Mallorca
Place of death missing
Roman Catholic writers
Spanish historians of religion